Two pore segment channel 1 (TPC1) is a human protein encoded by the TPCN1 gene.  The protein encoded by this gene is an ion channel.  In contrast to other calcium and sodium channels which have four homologous domains, each containing 6 transmembrane segments (S1 to S6), TPCN1 only contains two domains (each containing segments S1 to S6).

Structure
The structure of a TPC1 ortholog from Arabidopsis thaliana has been solved by two laboratories. The structures were solved using X-ray crystallography and contained the fold of a voltage-gated ion channel and EF hands. Only a single voltage sensor domain appears to responsible for voltage sensing.

Filoviral Infections
Genetic knockout and pharmacological inhibition experiments demonstrate that Two-pore Channels, TPC1 and TPC2, are required for infection by Filoviruses Ebola and Marburg in mice.

See also 
 Two-pore channel

References

Further reading

External links 
 

Ion channels